The 1907–08 Ohio Bobcats men's basketball team was the first university sponsored basketball program that represented Ohio University. James C. Jones was hired to coach the new program and played their home games in the basement of Ewing Hall.

Schedule

|-
!colspan=9 style=| Regular Season

References

 Ohio Record Book
 Ohio Basketball at 100

Ohio Bobcats men's basketball seasons
Ohio
Ohio Bobcats
Ohio Bobcats